Aleksandr Kogan (born April 6, 1986) is a Moldovan-born American scientist, who is known for his research on the link between oxytocin and kindness, and for having developed the app that allowed Cambridge Analytica to collect personal details of 80 million Facebook users. He worked as a University Lecturer at the University of Cambridge from 2012-2018 and is currently a technology entrepreneur.

Early life
Kogan was born in what was then the Moldavian SSR in the USSR (now independent Moldova). After Kogan’s family received death threats for being Jewish, his family immigrated to the United States when Kogan was seven. He earned a bachelor's degree from the University of California, Berkeley in 2008, and a PhD from the University of Hong Kong in 2011.

Academic career
Following his PhD, Kogan worked as a post-doctoral fellow at the University of Toronto before moving to University of Cambridge. He worked as a University Lecturer and Senior Research Associate in the Department of Psychology at the University of Cambridge from 2012 until 2018. At Cambridge, Kogan founded the Cambridge Prosociality and Well-being lab, where he and his students conducted research on understanding the biology and psychology of love, close relationships, happiness, and kindness.

Early in his career, Kogan and his colleagues authored numerous works revolving around the importance of communal strength, appreciation, and approach/avoidance goals in romantic relationships.

Later, Kogan researched the links between oxytocin and social processes. Findings from Kogan’s research suggest that individuals with the GG variant of the oxytocin-receptor gene were viewed as more trustworthy. Kogan and his lab have authored numerous other papers linking oxytocin to positive emotions, facial mimicry, and theory of mind. In related work, Kogan found that baseline vagus nerve activity was also related to people’s well-being.

After arriving at Cambridge, Kogan established a research collaboration with Facebook. As part of this collaboration, Facebook provided to Kogan data on 57-billion friendships across the world aggregated to the national level. Kogan’s lab then collected data from individuals using a Facebook app he had developed. This data collection was approved by the University of Cambridge ethics board. Combining these two data sources, Kogan’s lab published research showing that individuals with low socio-economic status have more international friends than people with high socio-economic status.

Global Science Research and Cambridge Analytica
In 2014, Kogan founded Global Science Research (GSR). As part of GSR, Kogan and his team developed the app, named "This Is Your Digital Life," that allowed Cambridge Analytica to collect personal details of allegedly 80 million Facebook users.

In 2018, the project gained widespread publicity following reporting by the New York Times and the Guardian, leading to investigations in both the UK and the United States. At the center of the controversy, Christopher Wylie, a former SCL employee who left the company in 2014, suggested that the data Kogan collected was a strong departure from previous election efforts and could be used for highly persuasive psychological targeting. Wylie contended that the data could be used as a psychological weapon. Professor Eitan Hersh, an expert on elections, testified to Congress that Wylie’s claims were inaccurate, and that the work of Cambridge Analytica did not excessively impact the outcome of the 2016 election. In interviews with BBC Radio 4's Today, CNN, and 60 Minutes, Kogan similarly argued that the data lacked the efficacy to make an appreciable impact. He also said that he was being used as a scapegoat by Facebook and Cambridge Analytica.

ICO Investigation
Following a roughly two year investigation, the UK’s data watchdog (ICO) concluded that many of Cambridge Analytica’s sales materials and Wylie’s initial claims had been exaggerated. In a letter to parliament, the ICO stated that Cambridge Analytica had mainly used “well recognised processes using commonly available technology”. Internal communications at Cambridge Analytica also indicated “there was a degree of scepticism within SCL as to the accuracy or reliability of the processing being undertaken. There appeared to be concern internally about the external messaging when set against the reality of their processing”. The ICO also found that data from 30 million people–rather than the 87 million initially reported–was shared with Cambridge Analytica.

Russian Spy Allegations
Some initial reports during the controversy suggested Kogan could be a Russian spy. This was based on Kogan having been born in the USSR and that Kogan also had an affiliation with the University of St. Petersburg in Russia, receiving funding for research on social media data and giving three lectures (in Russian) there since 2014. The University of Cambridge stated that Kogan had received prior approval from Cambridge before accepting the position. Kogan also challenged the logic of the claims, pointing out that he also received funding for research from UK, US, Canadian, and Chinese governments, and that his family immigrated from the former USSR because of death threats.

At the time of the controversy, Kogan was the chief executive officer of Philometrics, another big data analytics firm.

Settlement with the Federal Trade Commission
In 2019, Kogan settled with the Federal Trade Commission over allegations that he misled the initial survey takers. The FTC claimed the GSRApp had declared that no identifiable information about the participant would be collected–but “the GSRApp collected the Facebook User ID of those users who authorized it.” As part of the settlement, Kogan neither admitted nor denied the allegations of the complaint.

After Cambridge Analytica
Since 2019 Kogan has been the Chief operating officer of the automated customer service company HiOperator alongside his wife and company chief executive officer Elizabeth Tsai.  HiOperator has received over $1.25 million from 43 North, a Buffalo, New York accelerator program founded by Empire State Development and the State of New York intended to bring technology-related businesses and employment opportunities to the Western New York region. Alongside the funding, HiOperator has also received the opportunity to operate paying reduced state taxes, free office space in downtown Buffalo, and other specialized benefits intended to assist Buffalo-based employers. In March 2022 Hi-Operator released over 300 employees from its Buffalo office with a layoff under Kogans' direction.

Personal life
Kogan legally changed his last name to Spectre from 2015-2017 as a result of marriage.

References

Living people
Academics of the University of Cambridge
Alumni of the University of Hong Kong
University of California, Berkeley alumni
Moldovan emigrants to the United States
Cambridge Analytica
1986 births